Alik Gershon (born 3 June 1980, in Dnipropetrovsk, Ukraine) is an Israeli chess grandmaster. On 21 October 2010 he set the Guinness World Record for simultaneous games after playing 523 opponents in Tel Aviv. After 18 hours and 30 minutes, he won 454 games (86%), lost 11 and drew 58. On 9 February 2011 his record was broken by Iranian chess player Ehsan Ghaem-Maghami.

He was the World Under-14 champion in 1994 and World Under-16 champion in 1996. In 2000 he won the Israeli Chess Championship (tied with Boris Avrukh).

In 2007, his book San Luis 2005 (coauthored with Igor Nor) won the English Chess Federations Book of the Year award.

References

External links
 
 Israeli GM Alik Gershon breaks simul world record ChessBase

1980 births
Living people
Ukrainian Jews
Chess grandmasters
Ukrainian chess players
Jewish chess players
Israeli chess players
World Youth Chess Champions
Israeli chess writers
Israeli Jews
Sportspeople from Dnipro